Hermaea vancouverensis is a species of sacoglossan sea slug, a shell-less marine opisthobranch gastropod mollusk in the family Hermaeidae.

Distribution
This species is known to occur in the northeast Pacific in Alaska to California and South Kuril Islands, Russia.

References

Hermaeidae
Gastropods described in 1924